Talwandi Rajputan  is a village in Kapurthala district of Punjab State, India. The village is administrated by a Sarpanch, who is an elected representative.

Demography 
According to the report published by Census India in 2011, Talwandi Rajputan has total number of 47 houses and population of 237 of which include 121 males and 116 females. Literacy rate of Talwandi Rajputan is 71.56%, lower than state average of 75.84%.  The population of children under the age of 6 years is 19 which is 8.02% of total population of Talwandi Rajputan, and child sex ratio is approximately 583, lower than state average of 846.

Population data

References

External links
  Villages in Kapurthala
 Kapurthala Villages List

Villages in Kapurthala district